Cellulomonas chitinilytica is a chitinolytic, Gram-positive, rod-shaped and non-motile bacterium from the genus Cellulomonas which has been isolated from compost of a cattle farm near Daejeon in Korea.

References

 

Micrococcales
Bacteria described in 2008